Nalvi is a village in Haryana, India.

The majority of the population are Sikh and work in agriculture. The village is approximately 450 years old, it is named after Hari Singh Nalwa, who as a military general of Ranjit Singh's army. Maximum of kamboj area is settled here like nearby villages kalsani, nagla, thaska etc.etc.

See also
The area is very diverse and there are Four Gurudwara in the village, and 3 high schools  With A premium building Name Nanda’s Enclave

Villages in Kurukshetra district